Ngayong Nandito Ka (Now That You're Here) is a 2003 Filipino romantic drama film written by Henry King Quitain, directed by Jerry Lopez Sineneng, and produced by Star Cinema.

Partial cast
Kristine Hermosa as Margret "Garie" Cruz
Jericho Rosales as Enrique "Rocky" Rodriguez
Onemig Bondoc as Derek Cervantes
Dianne dela Fuente as Menchie
January Isaac as Donna Rodriguez
Cindy Kurleto as Angela
Jenny Miller as Mina Cruz
Angeli Gonzales as Gia Rodriguez
Sandy Andolong as Naida Cruz
Toby Alejar as Efren Cruz
Jaime Fabregas as Don Federico Rodriguez
Pinky Marquez as Donya Leony Rodriguez
Carlo Muñoz as Kent Rodriguez
Marc Acueza as Gilbert Cruz
Chinggoy Alonzo as Teddy Cervantes
Karlyn Bayot as Mandy
Justin Cuyugan as Steven
Steve Alonzo as Banjo
Gigette Reyes as Chythia

Production
After the success of "Forevermore" (released in June 2002), Rosales and Hermosa became the 2nd on-screen partner ("love team") movie from the top-rating primetime soap opera Pangako Sa 'Yo (2000-2002), where they played the role of Angelo and Yna (together with Bondoc, which also played the role of Errol).

Soundtracks
Ngayong Nandito Ka- Martin Nievera/Divo Bayer
Magsayawan - Dianne dela Fuente and All Star Cast of the movie
Afraid For Love to Fade - Jericho Rosales and Kristine Hermosa
Iniwan Mo - Dianne dela Fuente
Bakit Ba? - Stagecrew
Cinderella - Stagecrew
Bongga Ka Day - Dominic Benedicto
Huwag Ka Nang Magbabalik - Roselle Nava

External links

Star Cinema films
Films shot in Tokyo
Films set in the Philippines
Philippine romantic drama films
Films directed by Jerry Lopez Sineneng